Dichomeris lutilinea is a moth in the family Gelechiidae. It was described by Ponomarenko and Park in 1996. It is found in Korea.

The forewings are dark brown with a creamy white line at two-thirds of the costal margin and a yellowish line running along the margin from one-fifth of the costa to the middle of the termen. There are four yellowish longitudinal lines on the termen. The hindwings are greyish brown.

References

Moths described in 1996
lutilinea